Klementyna Grabowska née Wyganowska (1771–1831) was a Polish pianist and composer. She was born in Poznań and composed for piano. She married Józef Grabowski of Łukowa, and in 1831 moved to Paris. She died there in 1831. Grabowska was also known as Countess Clementine.

Works
Selected works include:
Sonata, op. 2 in B-flat major for the piano
Polonaises, collection

References

External links
 Scores by Klementyna Grabowska in digital library Polona

1771 births
1831 deaths
18th-century classical composers
19th-century classical composers
Polish composers
Women classical composers
19th-century women composers
18th-century women composers
Polish women composers